Malem Sambat Ka'ban (born 5 August 1958), also known as M. S. Ka'Ban, is an ex minister of forestry of Indonesia.

Politics 

Kaban was a member of the People's Representative Council. He was a Crescent Star Party official before he was appointed by President Susilo Bambang Yudhoyono as Forestry Minister. In addition, he has been involved in human resource development at Jakarta Public Relations. He examined the potential of economic damage from the creation of Gunung Leuser National Park in 1992. 

He was Chairman of the Economic Potential Weak research team in 1993, and a researcher at the Child Exploitation Strategy assessment study of the joint venture company Pertamina in 1994. 

He entered politics before the 1997 elections. The United Development Party sought to nominate him as a candidate from West Java. He declined, but the initial period of reform under Yusril Ihza Mahendra formed the Crescent Star Party, which emphasized the importance of Islamic law.

References

External links 

  Profile at TokohIndonesia

1958 births
Living people
Government ministers of Indonesia
Crescent Star Party (Indonesia) politicians
People from Binjai
People of Batak descent
Forestry in Indonesia